Carl Jonsson (16 July 1885 – 11 November 1966) was a Swedish policeman who won a gold medal in the tug of war competition at the 1912 Summer Olympics.

References

External links

1885 births
1966 deaths
Tug of war competitors at the 1912 Summer Olympics
Olympic tug of war competitors of Sweden
Olympic gold medalists for Sweden
Olympic medalists in tug of war
Medalists at the 1912 Summer Olympics